Ray Best (born  c. 1937) is a former American football coach.  He was the 27th as head football coach at Doane College in Crete, Nebraska, serving for five seasons, from 1971 to 1975, and compiling a record of  35–12–3.

Head coaching record

References

1930s births
Year of birth missing (living people)
Living people
American football tackles
Doane Tigers football coaches
Doane Tigers football players